One Country on Each Side is a concept originating in the Democratic Progressive Party government led by Chen Shui-bian, the former president of the Republic of China (2000–2008), regarding the political status of Taiwan. It emphasizes that the People's Republic of China and the Republic of China (commonly known as "Taiwan") are two different countries, (namely "One China, one Taiwan"), as opposed to two separate political entities within the same country of "China".  This is the position of the supporters of the Pan-Green coalition.

History
Chen used this phrase in an August 3, 2002, telecast to the annual conference of the World Federation of Taiwanese Associations meeting in Tokyo when he stated that it needs to be clear that "with Taiwan and China on each side of the Taiwan Strait, each side is a country." His statements were made in Taiwanese Minnan as opposed to Mandarin and drew a barrage of criticism from the mainland Chinese press, which had previously shied away from the types of attacks it gave to Lee Teng-hui, who promoted a similar "special state-to-state relations". The United States also expressed serious concerns over this concept, as the U.S. felt that this concept appeared to have departed from Chen's earlier pledge of "Four Noes and One Without". "State-to-state relations" had originally been translated in English as “country-to-country relations” but the Mainland Affairs Council got the translation changed to the less provocative option.

The Taiwan Action Party Alliance, founded on 18 August 2019, incorporated One Country on Each Side into its Chinese-language name.

See also 
Four Wants and One Without
Special non-state-to-state relations
Two Chinas

References 

Cross-Strait relations
Taiwan independence movement